Marian Fikus (born October 14, 1938, in Kobiór) is a Polish architect, urban planner and professor. Winner of over 100 awards and honors in urban planning and architectural competitions, including 5 awards in international competitions. He's also the winner of the SARP Honorary Award in 2008.

In 1968, Fikus with Jerzy Gurawski founded the Studio F-G and in 1988, he created the Studio Fikus with his wife Elżbieta Kosińska-Fikus.

References 

1938 births
20th-century Polish architects
Living people
21st-century Polish architects